Mesorrougi (Greek: Μεσορρούγι) is a small village and a community in the municipal unit of Akrata, Achaea, Greece. It is built on the forested slopes of Mount Chelmos (Aroania). The community consists of the villages Mesorrougi, Ano Mesorrougi and Solos. It is 1 km south of Peristera, 12 km east of Kalavryta and 17 km southwest of Akrata. Until 1912, Mesorrougi constituted a part of the municipality of Nonakrida.

Population

See also
List of settlements in Achaea

References

External links
Mesorrougi at the GTP Travel Pages

Aigialeia
Akrata
Populated places in Achaea